Norfolk is an extinct town in Mississippi County, in the U.S. state of Missouri.

Norfolk was platted in 1836, and most likely named after Norfolk, Virginia.  A post office called Norfolk was established in 1849, and remained in operation until 1855.

References

Ghost towns in Missouri
Former populated places in Mississippi County, Missouri